Persian Braille (Persian: بریل فارسی) is the braille alphabet for the  Persian language. It is largely compatible with Arabic Braille, which may be found (in uncontracted form) within Persian Braille texts. There are a few additional Persian letters that do not exist in Arabic.

Persian Braille is read from left to right, following the international convention. Numbers are also left to right, rather than switching direction as they do in printed Arabic.

Persian Braille charts

Letters

Numbers and arithmetic
Numbers are the same as in English Braille. Arithmetical symbols are introduced by a separate braille prefix.

Numbers follow operands without a space. For example,

is in braille,

Punctuation

See also
Arabic Braille
Tajik Braille
Urdu Braille

References

French-ordered braille alphabets
Persian language
Arabic braille